Monduran is a rural locality in the Bundaberg Region, Queensland, Australia.

Geography 
Lake Monduran forms much of the western boundary of the locality. The lake is the impoundment of the Kolan River by the Fred Haigh Dam (also known as the Monduran Dam). The river flows from the dam in the west of the locality through the locality to the east, where then forms the boundary between neighbouring localities Bucca and Damascus.

The Bruce Highway passes from east to west through the south part of the locality. Monduran Dam Road connects the highway to the dam wall.

There are two large areas of the Monduran State Forest in the locality, one area beside Lake Monduran and the other near the boundary with neighbouring Abbotsford. The most northerly part of the locality is in the Littabella National Park which extends into neighbouring Rosedale and Waterloo.

History 
The locality name is derived from a pastoral run held by John and James Landsborough (brothers of William Landsborough) in 1857.

In 1887,  of land were resumed from the Monduran pastoral run. The land was offered for selection for the establishment of small farms on 17 April 1887.

On 30 March 1866 bushranger James Alpin McPherson known as the "Wild Scotchman" was captured on Monduran Station by station manager William Nott.

Monduran Provisional School opened on 28 January 1910. It became Monduran State School on 1 February 1918. It closed in 1922.

Education 
There are no schools in Monduran. The nearest primary schools are in Gin Gin and Yandaran. The nearest secondary school is in Gin Gin.

Attractions 
The lake is popular for fishing and water sports; there are no boating restrictions on the lake. There are picnic facilities near the dam and a range of accommodation is available at the Lake Monduran Holiday Park.

The Monduran Anglers and Stocking Association Inc stock the lake with  barramundi and Australian bass.

References 

Bundaberg Region
Localities in Queensland